is a passenger railway station located in the city of Ushiku, Ibaraki Prefecture, Japan operated by the East Japan Railway Company (JR East).

Lines
Ushiku Station is served by the Jōban Line, and is located 50.6 km from the official starting point of the line at Nippori Station.

Station layout
The station consists of two opposed side platforms, connected to the elevated station building by a footbridge. The station has a Midori no Madoguchi staffed ticket office.

Platforms

History
Ushiku Station was opened on 25 December 1896. The current station building was completed in July 1984. The station was absorbed into the JR East network upon the privatization of the Japanese National Railways (JNR) on 1 April 1987.

Passenger statistics
In fiscal 2019, the station was used by an average of 12,444 passengers daily (boarding passengers only).

Surrounding area
 Ushiku City Hall
Ushiku Post Office

See also
 List of railway stations in Japan

References

External links

  Station information JR East Station Information 

Railway stations in Ibaraki Prefecture
Jōban Line
Railway stations in Japan opened in 1896